The U.S. city of Miami, Florida has the country's third-tallest skyline (after New York City and Chicago) with 439 high-rises, over 100 of which stand taller than  and 65 which are taller than . The tallest building in the city is the 85-story Panorama Tower, which rises  in Miami's Brickell district and surpassed all other buildings in height when it topped out in 2017. Nine of the ten tallest buildings in Florida are located in Miami. Overall, the skyline of Miami ranks as the fourth largest in North America and the 28th largest in the world.

History
Miami's history of high-rises began with the 1912 completion of the six–story Burdine's Department Store, although the Freedom Tower, built in 1925, is Miami's best-known early skyscraper and remains an icon of the city. From the mid-1990s through the late 2000s, Miami went through the largest building boom in the city's history. As a result of the construction boom, only two of the city's 25 tallest buildings were completed before the year 2000, and the city has the third-largest skyline in the United States, generally ranking only behind New York City and Chicago. The boom, however, ended abruptly around 2008 when the real estate market crashed and the late-2000s recession began. By 2011 the market began to return, with new office and condominium projects such as Brickell House announced for construction beginning in 2012. This was followed by a second boom that is currently active as of January 2019. This second boom has more proposed towers for the region than were built in the first boom from 2003 to 2010. Only 10 buildings out of 80 on the list were built before 2000, and only 18 were built before 2005.

Present
The tallest completed structure is Panorama Tower in Brickell. It reached the height taller than any other building in Miami in August 2017. The auger cast pile deep foundation system for Panorama Tower was installed by HJ Foundation, a subsidiary of Keller Group. One Bayfront Plaza is a mixed-use building proposed for 100 South Biscayne Boulevard, approved for construction since 2007, and scheduled to be completed as early as 2018. Since then, it has gone through several design changes and does not have a reliable construction date. By the end of 2016, there were about ten proposals for supertall buildings in downtown and Brickell. In addition to OBCC and OPB, these included The Towers by Foster + Partners, One MiamiCentral, Waldorf Astoria Miami, Capital at Brickell (CCCC Miami), World Trade Center of the Americas, Skyrise (tower), as well as the more speculative Sky Plaza and One Fifth.

FAA height limits
It was later reduced and is expected to rise , with 80 floors. It also has the distinction of being the first skyscraper over 1,000 feet (305 m), known as a "supertall", to be approved in Miami. Approvals for comparably tall buildings in Miami are very rare due to the proximity of Miami International Airport (MIA). The main runways of MIA align planes taking off and landing directly over the greater downtown area, and for this reason the Federal Aviation Administration sets precise height limits for construction in Downtown Miami. The fate of high rise construction in Miami was greatly threatened by a "One Engine Inoperative" (OEI) policy proposed by the FAA in 2014. This proposal would drastically reduce the maximum permitted height of structures around 388 airports in the country, even causing existing structures to be modified.

Tallest buildings
This lists ranks the tallest buildings in Miami that stand at least 400 ft (122 m) tall, based on standard height measurement. This includes spires and architectural details but does not include antenna masts. An equals sign (=) following a rank indicates the same height between two or more buildings. The "Year" column indicates the year in which a building was completed or topped out. Where applicable, floor counts are given by the observed measurements, as reported floor counts may include many skipped floors, not limited to floor 13.

Summary

Tallest buildings in each neighborhood

This lists the tallest building in each neighborhood, district, or sub-district of Miami. The "Year" column indicates the year in which a building was completed or topped-out for still under construction or stalled buildings.

Tallest under construction or approved
All of the planned high-rise buildings that were not constructed by the 2008 financial crisis were either put on hold or cancelled altogether until 2011 as the market was becoming stable once again.

Under construction
This lists buildings that are currently under construction in Miami and are planned to rise at least 400 feet (122 m). Buildings that have already been topped out are moved to the main list.

* Table entries with dashes (—) indicate that information regarding expected building dates of completion has not yet been released.

Approved and proposed
This list contains buildings that are approved by the city for construction and are planned to rise at least 400 feet (122 m). Many of these buildings were approved during the 2000s Miami skyscraper boom, but were put on hold during the Great Recession and have been announced to start construction in 2013 and early 2014.

Timeline of tallest buildings

There have been several buildings in Miami that have served as the tallest building in the city. While the 5-story Burdine's Department Store was the first high-rise building in the city, the Freedom Tower is generally regarded as Miami's first skyscraper. From 2003 to 2008, and again in the late 2010s and early 2020s, the Manhattanization of the city led to a huge amount of new development. Several buildings were under construction, and many that were approved or proposed could have earned the title of tallest building in the city upon completion. However, other than the Four Seasons Hotel (2003), none of them made it before the market crashed in 2007. In 2017, Panorama Tower will overtake Four Seasons as the tallest in the city and the state. In 2022 the Waldorf Astoria Miami began construction as the city's first 1000 ft super tall

See also
 List of tallest buildings in Florida
 List of tallest buildings in Fort Lauderdale
 List of tallest buildings in Jacksonville
 List of tallest buildings in Miami Beach
 List of tallest buildings in Orlando
 List of tallest buildings in Sunny Isles Beach
 List of tallest buildings in St. Petersburg
 List of tallest buildings in Tampa

Notes
A. ^ Due to strict zoning in the City of Miami and the FAA approval needed for each building, none of the tallest buildings in Miami have a defined spire.
B. ^ This building was originally known as the Ralston Building, but has since been renamed the Carrion Jewelry Center.

References
General
skyscrapercenter.com – miami
Emporis.com – Miami

Specific

External links

Diagram of Miami skyscrapers on SkyscraperPage
Miami structures on Structurae
Miami's Future Skyscrapers – Metro Atlantic

Miami
 
Miami-related lists
Tallest in Miami